Masan is an administrative region of Changwon, South Korea and was formerly an independent city. 

Masan can also refer to:

Masan (Gangwon), a mountain in South Korea
Masan (pastry), a Tibean tsampa pastry with brown sugar
Masan Group, a Vietnamese conglomerate company

See also
Masaan, 2015 Indian film
Masan, Iran (disambiguation)